Sufetula minimalis is a moth of the family Crambidae. It was described by Thomas Bainbrigge Fletcher in 1911 and is found in the Chagos Archipelago and the Seychelles, both in the Indian Ocean.

The larvae have been recorded on coconut.

References

External links

Moths described in 1911
Spilomelinae